David James Edwards (born 6 June 1980) is an English cricketer.  Edwards is a right-handed batsman who bowls right-arm fast-medium.  He was born in Stoke-on-Trent, Staffordshire.

Edwards made his debut for Staffordshire in the 2001 MCCA Knockout Trophy against Cheshire.  Edwards has played Minor counties cricket for Staffordshire from 2001 to present, which has included 19 Minor Counties Championship matches and 12 MCCA Knockout Trophy matches.  In 2001, he made his List A debut against Northumberland in the 2nd round of the Cheltenham & Gloucester Trophy which was played in 2001.  He played a further List A match against Warwickshire in the 3rd round of the competition which was played in 2002.  In his 2 List A matches, he took just a single wicket at a cost of just 72 runs.

References

External links
David Edwards at ESPNcricinfo
David Edwards at CricketArchive

1980 births
Living people
Cricketers from Stoke-on-Trent
English cricketers
Staffordshire cricketers